Måns Love Sörensson (born 2 April 1986) is a Swedish former professional footballer who played as a striker. Beginning his career with Landskrona BoIS in 2003, he had brief stints with Ajax, Ängelholms FF, and Falkenbergs FF before retiring at IFK Malmö in 2009. A youth international for Sweden between 2001 and 2005, he won a total of 26 caps and scored 20 goals for the Sweden U17 and U19 teams.

Club career

Landskrona BoIS 
Beginning his career with Landskrona BoIS in 1991, Sörensson made his senior debut for the team in a 2002 Svenska Cupen game against Tidaholms GIF at only 16 years of age. The following season, he made his Allsvenskan debut for the team on 6 October 2003 in a 3–0 away loss against AIK. He scored his first and only goal for the club in a 2005 Svenska Cupen game against Topkapi IK, as Landskrona won 3–0.

Loan to Ajax 
In January 2004 Sörensson signed a six-month loan contract with AFC Ajax, joining coach Danny Blind's junior squad. His stay at Ajax was cut short after injuring his knee during a practice session, and he returned to Landskrona in the beginning of May 2004.

Loan to Ängelholms FF 
He spent the second half of the 2006 season on loan at Ängelholms FF under manager Roar Hansen, scoring a total of two goals.

Falkenbergs FF 
Ahead of the 2007 Superettan season, Falkenbergs FF signed Sörensson on a two-year contract from Landskrona BoIS for an estimated 200,000 SEK. He left the club after only one season.

IFK Malmö and retirement 
In 2008, Sörensson signed for the Division 1 Södra club IFK Malmö. At the end of the season, he announced that he would take a time-out from football after that the club was demoted to Division 2 despite Sörensson's 10 goals in 23 games. In May 2009, Sörensson declared that he would retire from professional football at the age of 23.

Comeback 
Sörensson made a brief comeback in 2012, spending two seasons with Borstahusens BK in Division 4 and then Division 3, scoring a total of 5 goals in 23 games.

International career 
Sörensson played in 19 games for the Sweden U17 team, scoring 18 goals. He also represented the Sweden U19 team, scoring 2 goals in 7 games..

Personal life 
In 2018, Sörensson opened up a bookstore in Malmö, Sweden.

Career statistics

Club

International

References 

1986 births
Living people
Swedish footballers
Footballers from Skåne County
Association football forwards
Sweden youth international footballers
Allsvenskan players
Landskrona BoIS players
IFK Malmö Fotboll players
Falkenbergs FF players
Ängelholms FF players